Le Tagaloa Pita is a high chief matai and a former Member of Parliament of Samoa. He is a matai from the village of Sili on the island of Savai'i and has an honorary doctorate from Drew University in the United States. During his political career, he was a member of the Human Rights Protection Party (HRPP) and a cabinet minister with the portfolios of economic affairs and post office.

Prior to entering politics, Pita was acting principal of Alafua Agricultural Campus in Samoa, part of the University of the South Pacific. He was elected for a second term in parliament at the 1973 general election. and retained his seat in the same electorate until the year 2000.

Family
Le Tagaloa Pita's wife Aiono Fanaafi Le Tagaloa is a distinguished professor, educator and author in Samoa and who is also a former Member of Parliament in the country. Their children are high academic achievers. Their eldest son Mr. Semisi Aiono is a general surgeon who graduated from the University of Otago Medical School in New Zealand. Their daughter Leinani Aiono-Le Tagaloa is an assistant clinical professor in anesthesiology at the University of California, Davis, in the United States and another daughter Donna Aiono-Le Tagaloa-Ioane is a school principal in Samoa. In 2009, a third daughter Fanaafi Aiono-Le Tagaloa, also a published author, became the first Samoan-born person to gain a PhD in law from Otago university.

References

Further reading

Pita Le Tagaloa. Ofa Se Faalepo po o se Faalani. Pacific Printers Co Ltd, Apia, 1991.

Samoan chiefs
People from Palauli
Year of birth missing (living people)
Living people
Government ministers of Samoa
Members of the Legislative Assembly of Samoa
Human Rights Protection Party politicians